Jacopo da Montagnana, also known as Jacopo Parisato (c. 1440 to 1443 in Montagnana – 20 April and 14 Agusut 1499 in Padua) was an Italian painter of the early Renaissance who was mainly active in the Padua area.

Life
He was born in Montagnana, but mainly active in Padua where he died. He was either a pupil or influenced by Andrea Mantegna and/ or Gentile Bellini. He is considered a major Quattrocento painter in Padua.

He was active in the fresco decoration of the Capella Santa Maria degli Angeli in the Palazzo Vescovile of Padua, erected in 1495, and frescoed by Jacopo and Prospero da Piazzola. Also contemporary in Padua at that time was Pietro Calzetta and Francesco Bazelieri

References

External links

1440s births
1499 deaths
Quattrocento painters
Italian male painters
15th-century Italian painters
Painters from Padua
People from Montagnana